Fowlis Wester is a small village in Perth and Kinross, Scotland. The parish of Fowlis Wester includes the Abercairny estate to the south-west.

The 13th-century parish church is dedicated to Saint Bean and was restored in 1927. The category B listed building retains original medieval features including a leper's squint. Inside the church is an 8th-century Pictish cross-slab, a replica of which stands in the village square. The slab is carved with a Celtic cross on one side, and the other side bears typically Pictish symbols as well as carvings of animals and people.

See also
List of listed buildings in Fowlis Wester, Perth and Kinross

References

External links

Villages in Perth and Kinross